Labour International is an organisation for members of the Labour Party who live outside the United Kingdom. It is recognised by the National Executive Committee as a constituency Labour Party. The purpose of the organisation is to represent Labour members who live abroad, whether temporarily or permanently; to help maximise the Labour Party vote from overseas and to gain ideas from party members living in other countries.

References

External links

Organisation of the Labour Party (UK)
Political organisations based in London